The 1968–69 British Ice Hockey season featured the Northern League for teams from Scotland and the north of England. Murrayfield Racers won the Icy Smith Cup and the Autumn Cup.

Northern League

Regular season

Spring Cup

Final
Murrayfield Racers defeated the Paisley Mohawks

Icy Smith Cup Final
Murrayfield Racers defeated Glasgow Dynamos by an aggregate score of 9-5 in the Icy Smith Cup Final, which was a tournament that was the forerunner of the British Championship playoffs. Murrayfield won the first leg 7-2, Glasgow won the second leg 3-2.

Autumn Cup

Results

References

British
1968 in English sport
1969 in English sport
1968 in Scottish sport
1969 in Scottish sport